Concepción Rodríguez (born September 19, 1986 in Chepo, Panama) is a Panamanian professional baseball player. He is named after Dave Concepción.

Rodríguez was a member of the Panama national baseball team at the 2009 World Baseball Classic and 2019 Pan American Games Qualifier.

References

External links

1986 births
Living people
Danville Braves players
Dunedin Blue Jays players
Mayos de Navojoa players
Mississippi Braves players
Myrtle Beach Pelicans players
New Hampshire Fisher Cats players
Panamanian expatriate baseball players in the United States
People from Chepo District
Rome Braves players
2009 World Baseball Classic players
Panamanian expatriate baseball players in Mexico